Daniela Sörensen, better known by her stage name Daniela Rathana is a Swedish singer and songwriter. She was born and grew up in Akalla and was a backup singer for Sabina Ddumba, Kent, Zara Larsson and Seinabo Sey before embarking on a solo career. In 2020, she released her debut EP, Halva vägen fri. In February 2021, she released the song "Testamente", a duet with Oskar Linnros. Her debut album is set for release in 2021 via Linnros' label Dundra; it will include the singles "Ansikte" and "Testamente". Her 2022 single "Vandraren" is inspired by Basshunter and Crazy Frog.

Filmography

Television

Discography

Studio albums
 Rathana Club (2021) – No. 22 Sweden

EPs
 Halva vägen fri (2020)

Singles

Notes

References

21st-century Swedish women singers
Living people
Singers from Stockholm
Swedish women singer-songwriters
Swedish pop singers
Year of birth missing (living people)